Hynden Walch is an American actress. She is best known for voicing Starfire in the Teen Titans franchise and Princess Bubblegum in Adventure Time. She also voiced Penny Sanchez in ChalkZone, Amore and Lockette in the Nickelodeon version of Winx Club, Elsie in Stanley, and Yutaka Kobayakawa in Lucky Star. She is the current voice of the Disney character Alice. Outside of animation, Walch has appeared in live-action films like Groundhog Day and Jerry Maguire, and TV series like Law & Order.

Early life and career
Walch was born in Davenport, Iowa. She is of German descent. She started her professional acting career on stage at age 11. At 16 she attended the North Carolina School of the Arts, majoring in voice. In 1989, she received the Presidential Scholarship and went to the UNC School of the Arts in Winston-Salem, North Carolina. After UNC, she went to Chicago, Illinois, where she did plays, including The Rise and Fall of Little Voice on Broadway, where she won the Outer Critics Circle Award for her performance as the title character. As a high school senior, she was awarded as a Presidential Scholar in the Arts in drama. In 2005 she graduated summa cum laude from UCLA with a B.A. in American Literature and founded the Hillside Produce Cooperative, a free exchange of local, organically grown food, for which she was named runner up Citizen Entrepreneur of the Year by Global Green USA. Hynden has been married to Sean McDermott since 1999. 

On television she voiced Penny Sanchez on the Nickelodeon show ChalkZone, Elsie on the Disney Channel show Stanley, Ace in Justice League and Justice League Unlimited, Starfire in Teen Titans, Harley Quinn in The Batman and in anime, she has voiced Amy Stapleton in IGPX, Emiri Kimidori in The Melancholy of Haruhi Suzumiya, Yutaka Kobayakawa in Lucky Star, and Nia Teppelin in Tengen Toppa Gurren Lagann.

In video games, she voiced Jasmine and Junko in Viewtiful Joe: Double Trouble! and Coco Bandicoot and Polar in Crash Team Racing. She provided the English voice of Hitomi in Dead or Alive Xtreme 2 and Dead or Alive Paradise. She voiced Viridi, the Goddess of Nature, in Kid Icarus: Uprising, and her performance in the game was met with critical acclaim.

In live action, she played Mae Capone on The Untouchables and Debbie in Groundhog Day.

Filmography

Film

Television

Video games

Live-action

Theatre

References

External links

Official website

Living people
American film actresses
American people of German descent
American stage actresses
American television actresses
American video game actresses
American voice actresses
Cartoon Network people 
Disney people
20th-century American actresses
21st-century American actresses
Year of birth missing (living people)